Qush-e Sarbuzi (also Romanized as Qūsh-e Sarbūzī; also known as Qūsh Sar Nūrī) is a village in Tajan Rural District, in the Central District of Sarakhs County, Razavi Khorasan Province, Iran. At the 2006 census, its population was 2,032, in 373 families.

References 

Populated places in Sarakhs County